Stewart and Cyril Marcus (June 2, 1930 – July 1975) were identical twin gynecologists who practiced together in New York City. They died together in July 1975 at the age of 45.

Biography
Stewart and Cyril Marcus were born on June 2, 1930. They were gynecologists on the staff of New York Hospital and Cornell University Medical College. The brothers' lives and the circumstances of their deaths are the subject of an article in Ron Rosenbaum's collection of essays The Secret Parts of Fortune, as well as Linda Wolfe's "The Strange Death of the Twin Gynecologists" in the September 8, 1975, issue of New York magazine. Film director David Cronenberg drew on elements from the biography of the Marcus brothers for his 1988 movie Dead Ringers, in particular their decline and their deaths.

On July 17, 1975, the brothers were found dead in separate rooms of Cyril's Manhattan apartment at 450 East 63rd Street. The apartment was strewn with filth that had apparently accumulated over an extended period of time. Suspected factors in the deaths included mental illness and a possible suicide pact. 

It was first assumed that the brothers had died of barbiturate withdrawal, but the final report excluded this (the original toxicological report had been in error). Stewart died probably between July 10 and July 14 of a barbiturate overdose. Cyril died between July 14 (when he was last seen out of the apartment, apparently after Stewart had died) and July 17; his body showed no signs of the fatal convulsions accompanying narcotic withdrawal.

References

Further reading
 Bari Wood and Jack Geasland  (1977): Twins
 Ron Rosenbaum (2001): The Secret Parts of Fortune: Three Decades of Intense Investigations and Edgy Enthusiasms Pages 97–117.

1930 births
1975 deaths
American gynecologists
Substance dependence
Identical twins
American twins